The Indonesian Sea and Coast Guard Unit is an agency of Government of Indonesia which main function is to ensure the safety of shipping inside the Indonesian Maritime Zone. KPLP has the task of formulating and execute policies, standards, norms, guidelines, criteria and procedures, as well as technical guidance, evaluation and reporting on patrol and security, safety monitoring and Civil Service Investigator (PPNS), order of shipping, water, facilities and infrastructure of coastal and marine guarding. KPLP is under the Directorate General of Sea Transportation of the Indonesian Ministry of Transportation. Therefore, KPLP reports directly to the Minister of Transportation of the Republic of Indonesia. KPLP is not associated or part of the Indonesian National Armed Forces. KPLP, however often conduct joint-exercise and joint-operations with the Indonesian Navy.

During the Dutch colonial era, an agency under the colonial government called the Sea and Coast Guard Service was formed to protect the sea and coast of the Dutch East Indies. After the recognition of the independence of Indonesia by the Dutch, the agency was handed to the new Indonesian government and was renamed to Marine and Coast Guard Service. The agency then changed its name several times resulting in its present name.

KPLP is not associated with the Indonesian Maritime Security Agency. While the former is under the jurisdiction of the Ministry of Transportation, the latter is under the jurisdiction of the Coordinating Ministry for Political, Legal, and Security Affairs. Both agencies however have similar roles and functions and often conduct joint operations and joint maneuvers and simulation exercises together.

History 
During the Dutch colonial era, two agency of the colonial  government called the Governments's Navy and the Shipping Agency was formed to protect the sea and coast of the Dutch East Indies. The two organisation was briefly dissolved in 1942 during the Japanese occupation of the Dutch East Indies in World War II. After the Surrender of Japan, the two organization was recreated to continue their main function. In 1947, at the midst of the Indonesian National Revolution, the two agency was merged becoming the Sea and Coast Guard Service. In parallel to the Dutch agency, the Indonesian government who was then waging war against the Dutch formed their own organisation which has the same role as the Dutch Sea and Coast Guard called the Shipping Service of the Republic of Indonesia.

After the Dutch recognition of Indonesia, the Dutch handed the Sea and Coast Guard to the new Government of Indonesia. The Indonesian government then merged the Sea and Coast Guard and the Shipping Service of the Republic of Indonesia into the Marine and Coast Guard Service. The agency was immediately placed under the jurisdiction of the Ministry of Transportation. During the turbulence period in the 1950s as well as the rising of secessionist groups around the country, the government decided to transfer the MCGS into the Indonesian Navy on 31 January 1950  as a paramilitary branch. In 1952, the agency was again separated from the Indonesian Navy and was again placed under the jurisdiction of the Ministry of Transportation. The agency however still worked together with the Navy and Police to put down secessionist groups around the country until the early 1960s.

In 1962, the agency was renamed to Operasi Polisionil di Laut  ( OPDIL ) and was placed under the Directorate of Sea Operations of the Ministry of Transportation. In 1965, OPDIL was renamed again to Assistant Special Operations of Government Transport (AOKAP) based on SK.Menhubla Number Kab.4 / 9/16/1965. Based on SK. Minister of Transport No.M.14 / 3/14 Phb dated June 20, 1966, the agency changed its name to the Bureau of Shipping Safety (BKP) with the task of organizing the Special Police in the Sea and SAR. Based on SK. Maritime Minister: No. Kab.4 / 3/14 dated December 13, 1966 BKP was incorporated into the Operations Unit Command (KASOTOP) which later became the Directorate of Shipping while maintaining Police duties at sea. With the change of the Maritime Department into the Department of Transportation, based on SK. Minister of Transportation M.b./14/7 Phb dated August 24, 1968, the Special Duties of the SAR was incorporated into the Directorate of Navigation, and by the Minister of Transportation was renamed back to the Marine and Coast Guard  with the task of organizing the Maritime Security and Port Special Security units within national territories.

Based on SK Dirjen Hubla No.Kab.4 / 3/4 dated 11 April 1970 DPLP became the Sea and Coastal Operation Command (KOPLP). Based on Decree of the Minister of Transportation No. km.14 / U / plib-73 dated 30 January 1973 KOPLP became Sea and Coast Guard (KPLP)., which is the agency's present name.

Roles and function

Roles 
KPLP has the task of formulating and execute policies, standards, norms, guidelines, criteria and procedures, as well as technical guidance, evaluation and reporting on patrol and security, safety monitoring and Civil Service Investigator (PPNS), order of shipping, water, facilities and infrastructure of coastal and marine guarding.

Function 
 Develop policy in the field of sea and coast guard, including but not limited to patrol and security, safety supervision and civil service investigator, order of voyage, handling of disaster and underwater work, facilities and infrastructure of coastal and sea guard;
 Formulate standards, norms, guidelines, criteria and procedures in the field of sea and coast guard;
 Provide technical guidance in the field of sea and coast guard;
 Execute activity in the field of sea and coast guard.
 Provide technical guidance Directorate General of Sea Transportation and the preparation and provide technical qualifications of human resources in the field of sea and coast guard.
 Evaluate and report activity in the field of sea and coast guard.
 Administrative affairs, personnel and household within Directorate.

Organisation structure 

The KPLP Directorate is an Echelon II Unit under the Directorate General of Sea Transportation, Indonesian Ministry of Transportation. KPLP is also coordinate with other unit within Directorate General of Sea Transportation such as Technical Execution Unit Marine and Coastal Protection Base spread in Indonesia. KPLP Organization is governed directly through the Law Number 17 Year 2008 on the Sailing of Chapter XVII Articles 276- 281.
 Directorate of Sea and Coast Guard
 Sub-Directorate of Patrol and Security
 Section of Patrol
 Section of Security
 Sub-Directorate of Safety and Civil Service Investigator
 Section of Safety Monitoring
 Section of Civil Service Investigator
 Sub-Directorate of Order of Shipping
 Section of Seaport Affairs
 Section of Naval Accidents 
 Sub-Directorate Disaster Management and Underwater Service
 Section of Disaster Management
 Section of Underwater Service
 Sub-Directorate of Facilities and Infrastructure
 Section of Facilities and Infrastructure
 Section of Ship Crewman
 Sub-Division of Administration

Operation 
 Enforcement of legislation in the field of shipping,
 Investigation of the criminal act of shipping,
 Supervision and control of salvage activities and underwater work,
 Installation / exploration and exploitation of buildings above and below water,
 Providing search and rescue assistance in the sea and fire prevention,
 Security and supervision of navigation aids,
 Prevention of pollution in sea and beach waters as well
 Training of shipbuilding and installation

Facilities and equipment

Infrastructure 
Installations at Sea and Coast Guard Base consist of:
 Patrol Boat
 Dock;
 Sea and Coast Guard Command and Communications Room
 Workshop;
 Dormitory and Operational House;
 Water Bunkers;
 Armory and Ammunition;
 Warehouse Supplies;
 Temporary Detention Room / Cells;
 Generator Set;
 Helipad;
 Slip Way.

Equipment 

According to Director of KPLP, as of May 2018, KPLP has: 
 7 units of class 1 patrol boats.
 15 units of class 2 patrol boats
 59 units of class 3 patrol boats
 69 units of class 4 patrol boats
 245 units of class 5 patrol boats

In order to support the scope of work with the development of new bases across Indonesia, KPLP will be strengthened with a range of patrol boats that match, both types of first class vessels and third class. In addition, the ships will be equipped with weaponry for the security of both personnel and even the fleet of bad possibilities while operating in the oceans. Shipbuilding plans until 2019 will build 100 units of first and third class vessels to be deployed throughout Indonesia for the reinforcement of existing vessels and refurbishment of ships. Minister of Transportation Ignasius Jonan is targeting for the next five years the Marine and Coastal Guard Organization (KPLP) has 500 patrol boats of various sizes. The government will also add about 100 units of first class patrol boats (about 60 meters in size) and 150-200 units for grade two to five (size 42 meters to smaller). A total of 400 units of ship KPLP class patrol IV and V will also be replaced from the previous fiber made into rigid inflatable boat. In addition it will expand the patrol area and also add more personnel.

Identification 
The KPLP uniform is dark blue, darker than the Indonesian Navy uniform. If members are former Indonesian Navy personnel, they may retain their previous navy rank and specialty rating. All personnel use black beret with KPLP logo. Civil personnel wear the rank and insignia of their civil service grade.

Future

Separation from the Ministry of Transportation 
Based on Law No. 17/ 2008 on Shipping, mandated establishment of Sea and Coast Guard, a government agency that carries out the function of sea and coast guard and execute law and regulation related to sea and coast guard, the agency would be under the President's responsibility and will run operationally by the Minister. Government regulation regarding sea and coast guard which will define details and technical application should be issued. However, due to the debate and pros and cons, since 2008 until 2018, the government regulation has not been finalized and issued yet. This debate concerns the dilemma between the statute and harmonious or overlapping maritime patrols, oversight and law enforcement, which is also carried out by the Maritime Security Coordinating Board (which by the end of 2014 has become the Maritime Security Agency), Directorate General of Marine and Fisheries Resources Surveillance under Ministry of Maritime Affairs and Fisheries and several other institutions. Minister of Transportation Ignatius Jonan supported the creation of Maritime Security Agency, but rejected of a KPLP under Maritime Security Agency because of KPLP mandated by Law No. 17/ 2008 and KPLP is the agency recognized by IMO (International Maritime Organization). Minister Jonan also had proposed KPLP raised from Echelon II to Echelon I (Directorate General), although this reaped controversy from experts.

References

External links 
 Official website of the Directorate General of Sea Transportation 

Coast guards
Law enforcement agencies of Indonesia